Kishore Vaigyanik Protsahan Yojana (English: Young Scientist Incentive Plan) (KVPY) used to be a scholarship programme funded by the Department of Science and Technology of the Government of India, aimed at encouraging students to take up research careers in the areas of basic sciences. It offered scholarships and contingency grants up to the pre-PhD level to selected students. Begun in 1999, it was administered by the Indian Institute of Science.
The students who qualified in the KVPY Exam were eligible for a fellowship as well as admissions into institutes like the IISc and the IISER based on additional criteria. This exam had 3 Streams: SA (Class 11), SX (Class 12), and SB (First year BSc). Streams SP Basic Sciences (Class 11, 12 and First-year BSc, BTech) and SP Medicine (First-year MBBS) were discontinued since 2012–13. On 18 July 2022, the KVPY website announced the decision of DST to subsume KVPY with INSPIRE. KVPY Aptitude test will not be conducted from the year 2022 onwards. Ongoing KVPY fellows will continue to receive fellowship as per norms from DST.

Rewards
The students who qualify KVPY Exam are eligible for the fellowship. The students receive a fellowship from 1st year onwards of their graduation (science field). 

KVPY Fellows are also eligible to get the DST Inspire Scholarship granted by Department of Science & Technology (DST) Government of India worth  annually.

See also  
 Junior Science Talent Search Examination (for grade 9 students only)

References

External links
 KVPY home page
 KVPY Online Application

Scholarships in India
Government schemes in India
Science education in India
Standardised tests in India
1999 establishments in India